Kajol is an Indian actress who is known for her work in Hindi films. She made her screen debut in the 1992 film Bekhudi. She was noted for her performance and went on to sign the 1993 commercially successful thriller Baazigar opposite Shah Rukh Khan. She starred in the 1994 film Udhaar Ki Zindagi, which earned her critical acclaim. This was followed by a role in Yeh Dillagi alongside Akshay Kumar and Saif Ali Khan. Kajol featured in five films in 1995. She appeared briefly in the thriller Karan Arjun, and played Simran, an NRI in Aditya Chopra’s romance Dilwale Dulhania Le Jayenge, both of which ranked among the highest-grossing Bollywood films of the year, and the success of the latter established her career in Bollywood. As of 2021, Dilwale Dulhania Le Jayenge is the longest-running Indian film. Also in 1995, she appeared in the box-office flops Hulchul and Gundaraj. Her only screen appearance of 1996 was in Bambai Ka Babu, a financial failure.

In 1997, Kajol featured in the film Minsara Kanavu, her first Tamil feature. She played an obsessive lover in the mystery film Gupt (1997), and became the first woman to win the Filmfare Award for Best Performance in a Negative Role. Later in 1997, she featured as a poor girl in the romantic film Ishq, a box-office hit. In 1998, she played the leading lady in three romantic comedies, which were among the top-grossing Bollywood productions of the year — Pyaar Kiya To Darna Kya, Pyaar To Hona Hi Tha, and Kuch Kuch Hota Hai. Also in 1998, she played dual roles in the drama Dushman. The following year, she played the mistress of Ajay Devgn's character in Dil Kya Kare and starred in the commercially successful film Hum Aapke Dil Mein Rehte Hain. Following this, she starred in the films Raju Chacha (2000) and Kuch Khatti Kuch Meethi (2001), both of which performed poorly at the box-office.

Kajol played opposite Khan in Karan Johar's ensemble melodrama Kabhi Khushi Kabhie Gham... (2001), which became the highest-grossing Bollywood film in overseas to that point. After a five-year absence from film, Kajol played a blind Kashmiri girl in the romantic thriller Fanaa (2006). The film, which was based on terrorism, was a commercial success. Two years later, she featured as a talent judge for the television dance and singing reality show Rock-N-Roll Family. Later that year, she was paired with her husband Ajay Devgn in the romantic comedy U Me Aur Hum (2008). In the film, Kajol played an Alzheimer's patient. In 2010, she reunited with Khan and Johar in the drama My Name Is Khan, in which she played an Indian-American Hindu married to a Muslim man. For the film, she won the Filmfare Award for Best Actress for a record tying fifth time. Her next appearance of the year was in the family drama We Are Family, an adaption of the 1998 Hollywood film Stepmom.

In 2015, after five years, she made her comeback with Rohit Shetty's Dilwale, one of the highest-grossing Bollywood films of all time. In 2017, she was seen in Soundarya Rajnikanth's film Velaiilla Pattadhari 2, which was a profitable venture. She played a single mother who gives up her career as an aspiring singer in Pradeep Sarkar's family drama, Helicopter Eela, which didn't do well. After an absence in 2019, she starred in Tanhaji (2020), which was a major critical and commercial success. In 2021, she was praised for her portrayal of a woman with a traumatic childhood in the Netflix family drama Tribhanga.

Films

Shows

Dubbing

Television

See also
 List of awards and nominations received by Kajol

Notes

References

External links
 

Indian filmographies
Actress filmographies